República Argentina (Argentine Republic) is a station on Line 6 of the Madrid Metro. The station is located beneath the Plaza de la República Argentina (Argentine Republic Square) in the neighborhood of El Viso in Chamartín district in fare Zone A.

The station was already included in a development plan from 1967, but wasn't opened until 10 October 1979, when the first stretch of Line 6 was inaugurated.

References 

Line 6 (Madrid Metro) stations
Railway stations in Spain opened in 1979
Buildings and structures in Chamartín District, Madrid